The 1995 UEFA Intertoto Cup was the first edition of the tournament administered by the UEFA.  It saw Strasbourg and Bordeaux win their semi-finals to advance to the UEFA Cup, the latter eventually finishing runners-up. It also saw English representatives Wimbledon and Tottenham Hotspur banned from European competition for the following season, after both had fielded under-strength sides in their respective Intertoto Cup matches. The ban was lifted on appeal but England were still forced to forfeit their UEFA Fair Play berth for the 1996–97 UEFA Cup.

The 1995 competition also saw the return of Yugoslav clubs on the international scene after three years of ban due to UN embargo. However both representatives, FK Bečej and FK Budućnost, were eliminated in the group stage.

Qualified teams

Group stage

Group 1

1These matches were played at Rotherham United's nearby Millmoor ground, as Hillsborough was unavailable due to construction work ahead of UEFA Euro 1996.

Group 2

1These matches were played at Brighton & Hove Albion's Goldstone Ground as White Hart Lane was unavailable.

Group 3

Group 4

Group 5

Group 6

Group 7

1These matches were played in Belgrade since FK Budućnost's ground in Podgorica didn't meet UEFA standards.

Group 8

Group 9

Group 10

1These matches were played at Brighton & Hove Albion's Goldstone Ground as Selhurst Park was unavailable.

Group 11

Group 12

Ranking of second-placed teams

Round of 16

Quarter-finals

Semi-finals
Semi-finals Intertoto Cup games belong to the games of UEFA Cup

Note: No finals were held. The winning semi-finalists were entered into the UEFA Cup.

First leg

Second leg

Strasbourg won 7-2 on aggregate.

Bordeaux won 4-2 on aggregate.

See also
1995–96 UEFA Champions League
1995–96 UEFA Cup

References

External links
Official website
Results at Rec.Sport.Soccer Statistics Foundation

1995
4